Ace1, ACE-1, ace 1, or variation, may refer to:

 Angiotensin-converting enzyme 1 (ACE1)
 Samsung Galaxy Ace 1 (cellphone) 2011 smartphone
 Air Combat Emulator 1 (video game) (ACE 1), 1985
 ACE 1.x versions of ACE (compressed file format), the only freely available compression versions
 ancestral coatomer elements type 1 (ACE1), alpha solenoid type  structural Nucleoporins

See also

 Ace (disambiguation)
 Ace 2 (disambiguation)
 acel (disambiguation)
 acei (disambiguation)
 ACER1 (alkaline ceramidase 1)